Come may refer to:

Places
Comè, a city and commune in Benin
Come (Tenos), an ancient town on Tenos island, Greece

Music
Come (American band), an American indie rock band formed in 1990
Come (UK band), a British noise project founded in 1979
Come Organisation, its record label
Come (album), a 1994 album by Prince
 "Come", a song by Fleetwood Mac from Say You Will, 2003
 "Come" (Jain song), 2015
 "Come" (Jenny Berggren song), 2015

Other
COMe, COM Express, a single-board computer type
A possible outcome which may be bet on in craps, whence the general gambling expression

See also
Cum (disambiguation)
Saint-Côme (disambiguation)
Kum (disambiguation)